Miss World 1988, the 38th edition of the Miss World pageant, was held on 17 November 1988 at the Royal Albert Hall in London, UK. The winner was Linda Pétursdóttir (Queen of Europe) from Iceland. She was crowned by Miss World 1987, Ulla Weigerstorfer of Austria. Runner-up was Yeon-hee Choi (Queen of Asia) representing Korea and third was Kirsty Roper from the United Kingdom. The Miss World 1988 was hosted by Peter Marshall, who has hosted other Miss World competitions such as Miss World 1986, and Alexandra Bastedo, with musical performances by Koreana and 1970s American pop musician Donny Osmond.

Results

Placements

Continental Queens of Beauty

Contestants
84 countries participated in Miss World 1988.

Notes

Debuts

Returns

Last competed in 1956:
 
Last competed in 1964:
 
Last competed in 1968:
 
Last competed in 1971:
 
Last competed in 1985:
 
 
Last competed in 1986:

Withdrawals
  lost its Miss World franchise.
  lost its national pageant franchise to send delegates to Miss World and to Miss Universe.

Other Notes
 - Angela Visser competed in Miss Universe 1989, in May 1989, she only had 7 months to prepare to Miss Universe before going to win.

References

Further reading
 "Le triomphe discret de Kirsty Bertarelli". Largeur.com.

External links
 Pageantopolis – Miss World 1988

Miss World
1988 in London
1988 beauty pageants
Beauty pageants in the United Kingdom
Events at the Royal Albert Hall
November 1988 events in the United Kingdom